Ogden is an unincorporated community in Adams Township, Clinton County, Ohio, United States.

History
Ogden had its start in the 1850s when the Cincinnati & Muskingum Valley Railroad was extended to that point. The community was named after Ogden, Utah. A post office called Ogden was established in 1865, and remained in operation until 1913.

Gallery

References

Unincorporated communities in Clinton County, Ohio
Unincorporated communities in Ohio